Ross Roy Russell (born 18 December 1967) is a Trinidadian retired football manager, and former footballer who played for Defence Force and the national team as a goalkeeper.

Managerial career
After retiring as a footballer, Russell worked as a manager, returning to Defence Force from 2009 to 2015. He helped them win 2 TT Pro League. In 2015, he had a brief stint as the manager for the Trinidad and Tobago women's national football team. He was appointed president of the Northern Football Association, a league within the Trinidad and Tobago football league system.

Personal life
Russell is the father of the Trinidadian international footballer Ross Russell Jr.

References

1967 births
Living people
Trinidad and Tobago footballers
Trinidad and Tobago international footballers
Trinidad and Tobago football managers
Defence Force F.C. players
TT Pro League players
Association football goalkeepers